Commonwealth Brigade may refer to two joint Commonwealth of Nations units during the Korean War:
27th Infantry Brigade (United Kingdom), also known as the 27th British Commonwealth Brigade
28th Infantry Brigade (United Kingdom), also known as the 28th Commonwealth Brigade